Paul Tilsley CBE is a British local politician. He was deputy leader of Birmingham City Council and the senior Liberal Democrat in the council's ruling Liberal Democrat–Conservative coalition. , he is the council's longest-serving member, and was previously Lord Mayor of Birmingham, in 1993–4.

As a councillor, he represents the ward of Sheldon, and was previously a councillor in Aston ward. He was Chairman of the Birmingham Strategic Partnership from October 2005 until May 2012.

In January 2016, he announced his decision to stand down as leader of the council's Lib Dem group, a position held since June 2005, but to remain a back bencher.

Following the death in March 2017 of Cllr Ray Hassall, who was Deputy Lord Mayor, Tilsley was elected by the Council to complete his term of office.

Biography
He was responsible for placing Birmingham as one of the UK's leading cities on the Sustainability and Environmental Agenda, speaking at a number of Conferences both in the UK and in Europe on this issue.

From May 2005 until May 2012 he was Chairman of Digital Birmingham which brought together both public and private sector partners in driving forward the Digital Agenda to make Birmingham a leading "edge" City. One of his major achievements was to Champion the modernisation of Birmingham City Councils IT system, which has seen a wholesale change in the way that the Council conducts its business, and communicates and does business with its 1,000,000 citizens.

He was appointed Member of the Order of the British Empire (MBE) in the 1991 Birthday Honours for "political and public service" and Commander of the Order of the British Empire (CBE) in the 2014 Birthday Honours for services to local government.

References

Year of birth missing (living people)
Living people
Lord Mayors of Birmingham, West Midlands
Liberal Democrats (UK) councillors
People from Birmingham, West Midlands
Commanders of the Order of the British Empire